Matthieu Udol (born 20 March 1996) is a French professional footballer who plays as a defender for  club Metz.

Personal life
Born in France, Udol is of Guadeloupean descent.

References

External links
 

Living people
1996 births
Association football defenders
French footballers
French people of Guadeloupean descent
Footballers from Metz
FC Metz players
R.F.C. Seraing (1922) players
Championnat National 3 players
Challenger Pro League players
Ligue 1 players
Ligue 2 players
French expatriate footballers
Expatriate footballers in Belgium
French expatriate sportspeople in Belgium